The 1984–85 Temple Owls men's basketball team represented Temple University as a member of the Atlantic 10 Conference during the 1984–85 NCAA Division I men's basketball season. Led by third-year head coach John Chaney, the Owls played their home games at McGonigle Hall in Philadelphia, Pennsylvania. Temple finished in second place in the A-10 regular season standings, then won the A-10 tournament to receive an automatic bid to the NCAA tournament. As No. 8 seed in the East region, the Owls defeated Virginia Tech in the opening round before falling to No. 1 seed and eventual National runner-up Georgetown, 63–46. The team finished with a record of 25–6 (15–3 A-10).

Roster

Schedule and results

|-
!colspan=12 style=| Regular season

|-
!colspan=12 style=| Atlantic 10 Tournament

|-
!colspan=12 style=| NCAA Tournament

Rankings

Awards and honors
Granger Hall – A-10 Player of the Year

References

Temple Owls men's basketball seasons
Temple
Temple
Temple
Temple